The Schauer Filling Station, formerly located at 1400 Oxford Street, was one of the first gas stations in Houston, in the U.S. state of Texas. The station was completed in 1929, and listed on the National Register of Historic Places. The structure was demolished in June 2013 and delisted on June 14, 2017.

See also
 National Register of Historic Places listings in Harris County, Texas

References

Houston Heights
1929 establishments in Texas
Buildings and structures completed in 1929
Former National Register of Historic Places in Texas
National Register of Historic Places in Houston
Transportation buildings and structures on the National Register of Historic Places in Texas
Demolished buildings and structures in Texas
Buildings and structures demolished in 2013